Club Baloncesto León was a basketball team, based in León, Spain.

History

Early years (1981-1988)
Baloncesto León was founded by José Antonio Moirón García, Enrique Emperador Marcos, Juan Carlos Rodríguez Villanueva, Lisardo Mourelo González and Alberto Sobrín Martínez in León on 20 May 1981.

It began to play in Tercera División, the fourth division of Spanish basketball. In 1981, the team was promoted to Segunda División. After four years playing in the third tier, Baloncesto León was promoted to Primera División B, the second division.

Aranzana's first era (1989-1997)
In the middle of the 1988-1989 season, the coach Mariano Parra was sacked because Baloncesto León was in relegation posts. Then Baloncesto León signed Gustavo Aranzana, the coach of Cajapalencia, a team which was playing in Segunda División. Baloncesto León managed to leave relegation, and the next year, led by Xavi Fernández, was promoted to the ACB for first time in its history.

Baloncesto León's years under Aranzana's leadership were the most successful in the history of the team. Both in the 1991-1992 and 1992-1993 seasons, Baloncesto León reached position six in ACB.

In 1994 several things changed. The team changed the color of the T-shirt from yellow and green to red. Also, Xavi Fernandez transferred to FC Barcelona. Finally, in 1997, Aranzana left the team.

Decline and relegation (1997-2000)
In 1997, Edu Torres was hired as coach. He left the team after two years of failing to enter the playoffs. In 1999-2000, the team, coached by José Luis Oliete, was the last team in the classification, so Baloncesto León was relegated to LEB.

LEB (since 2000) and Aranzana's second era (since 2005)

Since 2000, Baloncesto León has been playing in the second category of Spanish basketball. The team has come close to promotion on several occasions, but has not achieved it.

After being coached by Roberto Herreras, Quino Salvo and Ángel Jareño, in 2005, Gustavo Aranzana was signed again as coach. In 2005–2006, Baloncesto León was, along with CAI Zaragoza, the highest-ranking team in the LEB regular season. In fact, Baloncesto León won the Regular Season. In the playoff, Baloncesto León easily defeated Palma Aqua Mágica and reached the semifinal round. Both final competitors of the semifinals get promoted. The rival was Bruesa GBC, 5th in regular season, which defeated Baloncesto León by 3-0. CAI Zaragoza did not get promoted.

In 2006–2007 the team reached the second position in the end of the  Regular Season. For first time in several years the team got a private sponsorship, Climalia. In the playoff, Baloncesto León defeated again Palma Aqua Mágica, (3-2). In the semifinals, they played versus CAI Zaragoza. León won the round 3–2, so, along with Ricoh Manresa got promoted to Liga ACB the 5/26/2007.

In the 2007–2008 season, León made a very poor season and they were relegated again to LEB Oro after winning only eight of their 34 matches. Their most surprising winning was in Vitoria, against Tau Cerámica. After that season, León continues playing in the LEB League, where they reached the play-offs in the next two seasons with Javier de Grado as coach.

After the 2011–2012 season the club ceased in activity and was dissolved. A new club was created to replace old Baloncesto León. It is called Fundación Baloncesto León and played its first season at Liga EBA.

Season by season

Trophies and awards

Trophies
Copa Príncipe: (1)
2007
Copa Castilla y León: (1)
2004

Individual awards
LEB Oro MVP
Michael Wilson – 2001

Notable players

 Xavi Fernández
 José Lasa
 Essie Hollis
 Corny Thompson
 Tate Decker
 Óscar Yebra
 Paolo Quinteros
 Amal McCaskill
 J.R. Reid
 Byron Houston

Notable coaches
 Gustavo Aranzana

List of coaches
 José Estrada 1980–1984
 Antonio Garrido 1984–1987
 José Clavijo 1987–1988
 Mariano Parra 1988–1989
 Gustavo Aranzana 1989–1997, 2005–2008
 Eduard Torres 1997–1999
 José Luis Oliete 1999–2000
 Roberto Herreras 2002
 Quino Salvo 2002–2003
 Angel Jareño 2003–2005
 Javier de Grado 2008–2012

External links
Baloncesto León Official Website
Retrato nº75: Baloncesto León

 
Defunct basketball teams in Spain
Former LEB Oro teams
Basketball teams in Castile and León
Former Liga ACB teams
Basketball teams established in 1981
1981 establishments in Spain
Basketball teams disestablished in 2012
Sport in León, Spain